Dong Son may refer to several places in Vietnam, including:

Đông Sơn
Đông Sơn District, a rural district of Thanh Hóa Province
Đông Sơn, Thanh Hóa City, a ward of Thanh Hóa city
Đông Sơn, Bỉm Sơn, a ward of Bỉm Sơn in Thanh Hóa Province
Đông Sơn, Hanoi, a commune of Chương Mỹ District
Đông Sơn, Haiphong, a commune of Thủy Nguyên District
Đông Sơn, Ninh Bình, a commune of Tam Điệp
Đông Sơn, Thừa Thiên-Huế, a commune of A Lưới District
Đông Sơn, Nghệ An, a commune of Đô Lương District
Đông Sơn, Thái Bình, a commune of Đông Hưng District
Đông Sơn, Bắc Giang, a commune of Yên Thế District
Đông Sơn village, a village in Thanh Hóa city

Đồng Sơn
Đồng Sơn, Quảng Bình, a ward of Đồng Hới
Đồng Sơn, Bắc Giang, a commune of Bắc Giang city
Đồng Sơn, Tiền Giang, a commune of Gò Công Tây District
Đồng Sơn, Quảng Ninh, a commune of Hoành Bồ District
Đồng Sơn, Nam Định, a commune of Nam Trực District
Đồng Sơn, Phú Thọ, a commune of Tân Sơn District

See also
 Đông Sơn culture, the Bronze Age culture of the area that would later become Vietnam
 Đông Sơn drums, major artifacts of the culture